Granigyra granulifera is a species of sea snail, a marine gastropod mollusk, unassigned in the superfamily Seguenzioidea.

Description
The size of the shell varies between 1.3 mm and 1.7 mm.

Distribution
This species is found at bathyal depths in the Mediterranean Sea; in the Atlantic Ocean off Madeira and the Bay of Biscay.

References

 Gofas, S.; Le Renard, J.; Bouchet, P. (2001). Mollusca, in: Costello, M.J. et al. (Ed.) (2001). European register of marine species: a check-list of the marine species in Europe and a bibliography of guides to their identification. Collection Patrimoines Naturels, 50: pp. 180–213
 Sysoev A.V. (2014). Deep-sea fauna of European seas: An annotated species check-list of benthic invertebrates living deeper than 2000 m in the seas bordering Europe. Gastropoda. Invertebrate Zoology. Vol.11. No.1: 134–155
 Hoffman, L.; Gofas, S.; Freiwald, A. (2020). A large biodiversity of "skeneimorph" (Gastropoda: Vetigastropoda) species from the South Azorean Seamount Chain, with the description of seventeen new species. Iberus. 38 (supplement 9): 1–82

External links
 Warén A. (1992). New and little known "Skeneimorph" gastropods from the Mediterranean Sea and the adjacent Atlantic Ocean. Bollettino Malacologico 27(10-12): 149–248

granulifera
Gastropods described in 1992